Jim Karsatos (born May 26, 1963) is an American football player, starting at quarterback for two years with the Ohio State Buckeyes. He is of Greek-American origin from the island of Kefalonia. He is one of two football players from the Greek island of Kefalonia that played at Sunny Hills High School in Fullerton, California (Robert Evangelatos Oliver, a star running back in the mid-1990s, also attended Sunny Hills).

He was drafted in the 1987 NFL Draft by the Miami Dolphins. He spent 2 years with the Dolphins.

References

1963 births
Living people
American football quarterbacks
Ohio State Buckeyes football players
Ohio State Buckeyes football announcers
American people of Greek descent